Lower Withington is a civil parish in Cheshire East, England. It contains 21 buildings that are recorded in the National Heritage List for England as designated listed buildings. Of these, one is listed at Grade I, the highest grade, one is listed at Grade II*, the middle grade, and the others are at Grade II. Apart from the village of Lower Withington, the parish is rural. The major building is Willington Hall, the present building dating from about 2000, and replacing earlier halls on the site. Five of the listed buildings are associated with the hall, including a sarcophagus in the garden, which dates from the Roman era. The parish includes part of Jodrell Bank Observatory, and five buildings on the site are listed. The other listed buildings are houses, farmhouses, cottages, and associated structures, seven of them timber-framed buildings dating back to the 17th century.

Key

Buildings

See also

 Listed buildings in Chelford
 Listed buildings in Goostrey
 Listed buildings in Marton
 Listed buildings in Peover Superior
 Listed buildings in Siddington
 Listed buildings in Snelson
 Listed buildings in Swettenham
 Listed buildings in Twemlow

References
Citations

Sources

 

Listed buildings in the Borough of Cheshire East
Lists of listed buildings in Cheshire